Leroy Allen (1951-2007), was an award-winning watercolorist and figurative artist. His realistic style focused on African American life and community, and won him more than 30 art awards nationally.

Biography
Allen was a Kansas City, Kansas native. He received his first art prize in the second grade when he won a National Scholastic Art Award for a crayon drawing of a horse show called “At the American Royal”. During high school, Allen was hired by the Progressive Shopper News, a black-owned monthly newspaper, to draw a weekly cartoon column. The cartoon was about a character named Sly, an unsuccessful criminal, and was used to discourage young people from a life of crime.  In high school, the comic series Allen created became a comic book.

Allen joined the Army and served in Vietnam and was honorably discharged in 1972.

Upon graduation from the University of Kansas School of Fine Art (BFA, 1977), Allen was hired by Hallmark Cards in 1980, where he became a technical supervisor. Over the years, Allen worked with and exhibited with noted Hallmark artists including Thomas Blackshear, Nancy Devard, Henry Dixon, Shane Evans, Cathy Ann Johnson, Jonathan Knight, and Dean Mitchell. He retired from Hallmark Cards after 24 years.

Of Allen's artistic skill, New Orleans art critic Doug MacCash wrote: "Although many people think of watercolor as the genteel choice of Sunday painters, it may actually be the most difficult artistic technique to master. A great watercolorist is able to create a painting with such economy and deftness that the hand of the artist is almost unnoticeable - a feat akin to walking across a snowy field without leaving footprints. Both (Leroy) Allen and (Dean) Mitchell can do just that."

Exhibitions

Awards
 “Nestle in Sunset”, Miriam Whitsett Memorial Award, Mississippi Museum of Art, Jackson, MS (2003)
 “Sundrops”, a watercolor painting, Connoisseur Award, California Watercolor Association's 35th National Exhibition, Academy of Art College Gallery, San Francisco, CA (2003)
 Jurors Award, Arizona Aqueous XVI 2001 National Juried Exhibition, Tubac Center for the Arts, Tubac, AZ (2001).
 “Papa Jim”, a charcoal piece, Best Drawing Award, Bosque Conservatory Art Council's 16th Annual National Art Competition, Bosque Conservatory, Clifton, TX (2001).
 Merchandise Award, Pastel Society of North Florida at the Fort Walton Beach Museum of Art, “Pastel '98” juried exhibition.
 “Ma'am” (Tribute to P.H. Polk), Juror's Award of Excellence, Oklahoma Art Workshops' 11th Annual National Juried Exhibition (1994).

Collections
 Nerman Museum of Contemporary Art, Overland Park, KS
 Petrucci Family Foundation Collection of African American Art
 Sprint Nextel Art Collection includes Allen's American Sunrise, a still life featuring a blue pitcher with berries.
 Portrait of first African American mayor of St. Louis Freeman R. Bosley, Jr. by Leroy Allen, St. Louis City Hall, 2nd floor with portraits of past mayors.

Death
Allen died of suicide in March 2007 and is laid to rest in Kansas City, Kansas.  In 2008, “This One I'll Do (For Leroy)”, a charcoal portrait of Leroy Allen by artist Lonnie Powell, was included in the exhibit “To Create a Better World: Artists as Educators.”

External links

 Leroy Allen on the African American Visual Artists Database

References

1951 births
2007 deaths
20th-century American painters
American male painters
American watercolorists
American comics artists
Painters from Kansas
Hallmark Cards artists
People from Kansas City, Kansas
20th-century African-American painters
21st-century African-American people
20th-century American male artists